Fraochy Bay is a Scottish Gaelic cartoon created by Neillydubh Animation Limited and produced by Moja TV for BBC Alba and funded by MG Alba. The series is set in the fictional town of Fraochy Bay, notionally located somewhere off the west coast of Scotland, with no central theme other than an exploration of the slightly odd characters and surreal events that take place in and around the town.

The series debuted on BBC Alba in late 2009 with its first three episodes airing on December 21, 22 and 23rd.

Series four's original run began in April 2013 with a fifth series following in October 2014 until 1 March 2015.

Episodes

Season 1 (2009–2010)

Season 2 (2010–2011)

Season 3 (2012)

Season 4 (2013)

Season 5 (2014–2015)

References

External links
 

2009 Scottish television series debuts
2015 Scottish television series endings
2000s British children's television series
2010s British children's television series
BBC high definition shows
British children's animated comedy television series
British children's animated fantasy television series
Scottish Gaelic mass media
English-language television shows
2000s British animated television series
2010s British animated television series
2000s Scottish television series
2010s Scottish television series